Ferdinand Sarnitz, known by his stage name Ferdinand fka Left Boy, is an Austrian singer and producer from Vienna, Austria.

Biography 

Sarnitz was born on 17 December 1988 in Vienna, Austria to Austrian musician André Heller and Sabina Sarnitz. He attended the American International School of Vienna and graduated in 2007. Sarnitz spent much of his free time at school rapping. At the age of 18, Sarnitz went to New York City to study audio engineering at the Institute of Audio Research for a year. After living in his hometown Vienna for a short while, he decided to move to Brooklyn to live in a shared apartment with two directors, a producer and a photographer.

In December 2010, Sarnitz released his first mixtape The Second Coming for free download.  In mid-2011, he started making music videos for all of the songs. Sarnitz often uses samples for his English songs which haven't been released for usability which is why an official sound carrier couldn't be released. Even though he hadn't been signed to a record label, he was able to perform at festivals in 2012, including "Sea of Love" and "HipHop Open". Live, he is accompanied by the dance group "Urban Movement". Sarnitz has a son called Yves-Louis. He cites Wu-Tang Clan, Oxmo Puccino, De La Soul, Atmosphere, Ugly Duckling, Daft Punk, Édith Piaf, Nina Simone, Oumou Sangaré, and Gipsy Kings as his inspirations.

In 2015, he rapped in the Official Theme Tune for the Eurovision Song Contest 2015 "Building Bridges".

Discography

Album

Mixtapes

EP

Singles

References

External links 

 Official homepage

1988 births
Living people
21st-century Austrian male singers
English-language singers from Austria
Austrian expatriates in the United States